WBCN and The American Revolution is a feature-length documentary film that chronicles progressive rock radio station WBCN-FM in Boston, during the years 1968 to 1974, through the original sights, sounds and stories, and examines the station's role in both covering and promoting the dramatic social, political and cultural changes that took place during that era.  The film was produced and directed by Bill Lichtenstein with the Peabody Award-winning Lichtenstein Creative Media.

The film's use of crowdsourcing to collect archival material for its production and to raise the funds necessary to produce it has been called "A revolution in documentary filmmaking" by the American University Center for Social Media. In order to produce the film, tens of thousands of individual archival items, including photographs, audio recordings, film, video and memorabilia, were shared with the producers by members of the public.  A collection of these items has been established at University of Massachusetts Amherst.

References

External links
 
 
Audio stream from The American Revolution archives 
The American Revolution Archives Collection at UMass Amherst

Documentary films about radio
American documentary films
Documentary films about United States history
Documentary films about American politics
Films set in Boston
Radio in the United States
2012 films
2010s American films